Greg Jenner (born 1982) is a British author and public historian with a particular interest in communicating history through pop culture and humour.

Early life
Jenner studied a History & Archaeology BA and Medieval Studies MA at The University of York.

Career
Jenner has worked as an historical consultant on the Horrible Histories books and television shows. Jenner has accredited the success of Horrible Histories  to a non-patronising approach to children’s television.

Jenner has written for GQ magazine and has appeared as a guest on Richard Herring's interview podcasts and on the Art Detective podcast. He also featured on the BBC Radio 4 programme Great Lives, discussing Gene Kelly.

He has appeared more than once as a guest on QI spin-off podcast No Such Thing as a Fish. and has made appearances on the Simon Mayo and the Steve Wright shows on BBC Radio 2.

Jenner featured as an expert on the BBC2 television programme Inside Versailles, as well as for the Independent newspaper, discussing historical accuracy in television programmes.

Since 2019, Jenner has presented a BBC Sounds podcast, You’re Dead To Me. Each episode sees him to talk to both a historian and comedian about a historical figure or time period. As well as the streamed edition, a radio-edit version is broadcast on BBC Radio 4. In February 2023 the show won in the Best Radio Entertainment Show category at the Comedy.co.uk Awards.

In 2013, Jenner spoke out against proposals for changes to the national curriculum proposed by then Education Secretary Michael Gove.

Publications 
Jenner is the author of several books:

 A Million Years In A Day: A Curious History of Daily Life, From The Stone Age To The Phone Age in which he described how routines and habits today had their genesis in the past as well as highlighting contrasts in every day routines through the ages.
 Dead Famous: An Unexpected History of Celebrity from Bronze Age to Silver Screen was released in 2020.
 Ask a Historian: 50 Surprising Answers to Things You Always Wanted to Know was released in 2021.

Personal life 
Jenner is a supporter of Tottenham Hotspur.

He is teetotal.

References

1982 births
Living people
21st-century British historians
Alumni of the University of York
21st-century British male writers